Aidan James Laprete Powell (born September 6, 2001) is an American singer, songwriter, actor, and record producer.

Early life
Laprete was born on September 6, 2001, in Honolulu, Hawaii. 
Laprete's first time acting was at the age of 18 months in a TV pilot, "The Break". He continued to do commercials as a child. Laprete started playing the ukulele at age four, and started to sing at age eight. He started performing at age six in children's groups at local ukulele festivals.

Musical style
The ukulele, played as a pop instrument rather than in traditional Hawaiian style, is his trademark. He has said, "I want to be able to show the ukulele to everybody and be able to show that you can do anything with it." After rebranding to Laprete from Aidan James in 2020, he changed his sound completely, now being labeled as alternative pop music with electronic, hip hop, ambient, and UK garage influences. His influences include Jon Bellion, The 1975, Bon Iver, Jai Paul, and Sevdaliza. In live performances, James uses a Boss RC-300 to create loops live on the spot, Roland SPD-SX to trigger samples, Ableton Live, and TC Helicon's Voicelive 3 for ukulele and singing effects.

Career 
At age eight, Laprete performed the song "Hey Soul Sister" by Train at the 2010 Ukulele Festival. On July 19, 2010, a video of this performance was uploaded by "elrollo79" onto YouTube. The video quickly went viral and has received over twenty million views. The video got the attention of a number of popular artists, among them Jack Johnson and Mick Fleetwood as well as Train's Pat Monahan who is reported to have called it his favorite cover version of the song. Jack Johnson asked James to be a part of the 2010 Kokua Festival.
James played at the keiki stage at the festival.

In 2010, Laprete was approached by producer and creator of the 2010 remake of Hawaii Five-0, Peter Lenkov, and was asked to be on an episode of the program. He was featured in episode 5, Season 1 singing "Hey Soul Sister".

Laprete can be seen in Train's music video for their song Mermaid, which was filmed in Honolulu. The video premiered on February 27, 2013.

In 2014, Laprete released his first single under the artist name Aidan James, "One of the Ones", with Nashville composer Jeff Dayton. The single was recorded at Island Sound Studios in Honolulu and was produced by Gaylord Holomalia. He went on a solo tour independently to the east and west coast promoting his single. In Washington, he performed on the steps of the Capitol Hill and did a private performance at the Google Headquarters. 
Laprete's debut EP, Live Again was released on December 25, 2014. The EP consists of 4 tracks. It was reviewed in local magazine MidWeek, with Bill Mossman saying: "The four-song album represents James's maiden voyage into unchartered waters as a fast-maturing artist. His voice is deeper and more refined, while his playing chops are rhythmically and tastefully on fleek (as teenagers his age might say). And although the cuteness factor is still present on the album, thanks to his pop rock-friendly melodies, James's growth as a musician can be heard in his burgeoning songwriting abilities".

A Hawaiian magazine, MidWeek, did a cover story on Laprete titled "How Aidan James Became One of Earth's Mightiest Heroes". The story was about him being featured in HBO's documentary, Saving My Tomorrow.

Laprete's debut album under the name Aidan James, Echoes was released on December 1, 2015.

He joined the lineup for Train's 2016 Sail Across the Sun cruise, along with Phillip Phillips, Michael Franti, Andy Grammer, and Shaggy.

Laprete was interviewed by ABC News and 3 of his music videos were featured at Good Morning America's Summer Concert Series in Central Park on July 22, 2016.

On March 29, 2017, Laprete was featured on an episode of HBO's Saving My Tomorrow.

Laprete released the single, "What My Friends Talk About" on December 8, 2017, with distribution from Create Music Group.

On May 18, 2018, the single "Casanova", a collaboration between James and Chosen Jacobs, was released. It was written and produced by James and Jacobs.

In 2019, he produced and co-wrote the album, Head To Head by singer Grayson. The EP was released on May 10, 2019, on One Half Records. The project features production and writing from Laprete. Head To Head received support from outlets including Billboard, calling the single a "synth pop jam". 

Aidan changed his artist name to Laprete in August 2019. On August 23, 2019, the single "Ina" was released. The EP, "Sanguine", was released on July 31, 2020.

Laprete has appeared in a variety of TV shows and films including Chad, Everything's Gonna Be Okay, Alexa and Katie, and Under the Blood Red Sun.

In 2022, Laprete played the role of Henry Tanaka in the second season of the Amazon Prime Video series, The Wilds.

Filmography

Film

Television

References

External links
 Official Site
 YouTube Video
 

2001 births
Living people
21st-century American singers
American child singers
American male singer-songwriters
Hawaiian ukulele players
People from Honolulu
21st-century American male singers
Singer-songwriters from Hawaii